Kamal Abdulsalam El-Gargni (born in 1971) is a Libyan professional bodybuilder residing in England. He won the 212 Mr. Olympia in 2019.

Biography 
Kamal El-Gargni, originally from Libya, started training in 1993 and won his first competition – Libyan championship (70 kg class) in 1994. In 1997 moved to Malta and in 1998, to the United Kingdom. At 2001 NABBA Britain he won his height class division. In 2002, he started representing Qatar. Between 2003–2014 he won six IFBB World Amateur class shows, 10 Asian Gold Cup wins, and multiple gold medals in African and European Championships.

Competitive history 
Kamal Elgargni has competed in multiple professional shows:

 2001 NABBA Mr. Universe, short, 1st
 2002 NABBA European Championships, overall, 1st
 2002 NABBA European Championships, short, 1st
 2002 NABBA World Championships, overall, 1st
 2002 NABBA World Championships, short, 1st
 2003 IFBB Asian Amateur Championships, middleweight, 1st
 2003 IFBB Night of Champions, 21st (did not place)
 2003 IFBB World Amateur Championships, middleweight, disqualified
 2004 IFBB Asian Amateur Championships, middleweight, 1st
 2005 IFBB Asian Amateur Championships, middleweight, 1st
 2005 IFBB World Amateur Championships, middleweight, 1st
 2005 World Games, middleweight, 1st
 2006 Asian Games, middleweight, 1st
 2006 IFBB World Amateur Championships, middleweight, 1st
 2007 Asian Amateur Championships - IFBB, middleweight, 1st
 2007 NPC Excalibur (Los Angeles), light-heavyweight, 1st
 2008 IFBB World Amateur Championships, middleweight, 1st
 2009 Arnold Amateur - IFBB, light-heavyweight, 1st
 2009 IFBB World Amateur Championships, light-heavyweight, 4th
 2009 World Games, heavyweight, 2nd
 2011 ABBF Asian Championships, overall 1st
 2011 ABBF Asian Championships, light-heavyweight, 1st
 2011 WBPF World Championships, light-heavyweight, 1st
 2013 IFBB Asian Amateur Championships, classic, 2nd
 2013 IFBB Asian Amateur Championships, heavyweight, 1st
 2013 IFBB Asian Amateur Championships, masters (40+), 2nd
 2013 ABBF Asian Championships, light-heavyweight, 1st
 2013 ABBF Asian Championships, overall, 1st
 2013 IFBB Mediterranean Amateur Championships, overall, 1st
 2013 IFBB Mediterranean Amateur Championships, light-heavyweight, 1st
 2013 IFBB Mediterranean Amateur Championships, Masters, 1st
 2013 World Amateur Championships - IFBB, light-heavyweight, 1st
 2018 IFBB Arnold Classic, 212 lb, 1st
 2018 IFBB Mr. Olympia, 212 lb, 3rd
 2019 IFBB Mr. Olympia, 212 lb, 1st
 2020 IFBB Mr. Olympia, 212 lb, 2nd
 2021 IFBB Mr. Olympia, 212 lb, 3rd

References

Libyan bodybuilders
Qatari bodybuilders
1971 births
Living people
Libyan emigrants to Qatar
Naturalised citizens of Qatar
Asian Games medalists in bodybuilding
Bodybuilders at the 2006 Asian Games
Asian Games gold medalists for Qatar
World Games silver medalists
Medalists at the 2006 Asian Games
World Games gold medalists
Competitors at the 2009 World Games
Competitors at the 2005 World Games